Cholesteryl ester, a dietary lipid, is an ester of cholesterol. The ester bond is formed between the carboxylate group of a fatty acid and the hydroxyl group of cholesterol. Cholesteryl esters have a lower solubility in water due to their increased hydrophobicity. Esters are formed by replacing at least one –OH (hydroxyl) group with an –O–alkyl (alkoxy) group. They are hydrolyzed by pancreatic enzymes, cholesterol esterase, to produce cholesterol and free fatty acids. They are associated with atherosclerosis.

Cholesteryl ester is found in human brains as lipid droplets which store and transport cholesterol. Increased levels of cholesteryl ester have been found in certain parts of the brain of people with Huntington disease. Higher concentrations of cholesteryl ester have been found in the caudate and putamen, but not the cerebellum, of people with Huntington Disease compared with levels in controls. Increase in cholesteryl ester has also been found in other neurological disorders like multiple sclerosis and Alzheimer’s disease.

See also
 Cholesteryl ester transfer protein
 Cholesteryl ester storage disease
 Acyl CoA cholesteryl acyltransferase (ACAT)
 Lecithin–cholesterol acyltransferase (LCAT)

References

Carboxylate esters
Steroids